The Hwasal-2 is a cruise missile of DPRK . This missile was first observed in Self-Defense-2021 with another cruise missile.

Description 
On 23 February 2023, the Korean Central News Agency announced the missile test revealing its name as Hwasal-2.

List of Hwasal-2 launches

External Links

References

Surface-to-surface missiles
Cruise missiles